The Mick is an American sitcom television series created by Dave and John Chernin. The series follows a woman who relocates from Warwick, Rhode Island to Greenwich, Connecticut, to watch her sister's children after her sister and brother-in-law are arrested for tax fraud. The series debuted on January 1, 2017 on Fox.

Series overview

Episodes

Season 1 (2017)

Season 2 (2017–18)

Ratings

Season 1 (2017)

Season 2 (2017–18)

References

External links

Lists of American sitcom episodes